Florea Fătu (17 July 1924 – 11 December 1995) was a Romanian football striker. He was a part of CSCA București's team that won the first match in the history of the club.

International career
Florea Fătu played one friendly game at international level for Romania, coming as a substitute at half-time when he replaced Nicolae Dumitrescu in a 2–1 victory against Poland played on the Polish Army Stadium from Warsaw.

Honours
Petrolul Ploiești
Divizia B: 1953
Cupa României runner-up: 1952

Notes

References

External links

Florea Fătu at Labtof.ro

1924 births
1995 deaths
Romanian footballers
Romania international footballers
Association football forwards
Liga I players
Liga II players
FC Petrolul Ploiești players
FC Steaua București players
People from Brăila County